The Omani national ice hockey team, nicknamed The Khanjars ( Al-Khanajar), is the national ice hockey team of Oman. They are controlled by the Oman Ice Sports Committee and has been an associate member of the International Ice Hockey Federation (IIHF). Oman is currently not ranked in the IIHF World Ranking and have not entered in any World Championship tournaments or at any Olympic Games, but have played in the Challenge Cup of Asia, a regional tournament for lower-tier hockey nations in Asia.

History
Oman played its first game in 2010 during the inaugural Gulf Ice Hockey Championship. Oman played three games against Kuwait, Saudi Arabia, and the United Arab Emirates in which they lost all three games. Oman also played in the Second Ice Hockey Gulf Cup in 2012. They played 5 games which in they won 2 and lost three which made them third, winning the bronze medal.

Tournament record

Challenge Cup of Asia

GCC Gulf Championship

Roster
Roster for the 2019 IIHF Challenge Cup of Asia.

Head coach:  Khalid Muhamad (خالد محمد)

All-time record against other nations
Last match update: 6 March 2019

All-time record against other clubs
Last match update: 26 November 2016

References

External links
IIHF profile
National Teams of Ice Hockey profile
Oman Ice Hockey

Oman
National ice hockey teams in the Arab world
Ice hockey